Arthur Stratton (born October 8, 1935) is a Canadian former professional ice hockey player. He played 95 games in the NHL for 5 separate teams. These included the New York Rangers (18 games), Detroit Red Wings (5 games), Chicago Black Hawks (2 games), Pittsburgh Penguins (58 games), and Philadelphia Flyers (12 games). Stratton's NHL career was scattered across 4 playing seasons between 1959 and 1968, where he scored 18 goals and 33 assists.

Stratton's professional hockey career was more illustrious than his NHL statistics demonstrate. Starting in 1955 and playing straight until 1976, he was only in the NHL for 4 seasons and with 5 different teams. Stratton contributed to the following professional hockey teams during his lengthy and productive career: St. Catharines Teepees, Cleveland Barons, North Bay Trappers, Winnipeg Warriors, Springfield Indians, Kitchener-Waterloo Beavers, Buffalo Bisons, Pittsburgh Hornets, St. Louis Braves, Seattle Totems, Tidewater Wings, Virginia Red Wings, Rochester Americans, Richmond Robins and Hampton Gulls. He holds the American Hockey League record for points in a game with 9 (all assists) while playing with the Buffalo Bisons against Pittsburgh March 17, 1963.

Stratton also coached the Syracuse Eagles for part of the 1974/1975 American Hockey League Season. That year, the Eagles were last in the league standings, with a record of 21 games under .500.

Awards and achievements
MJHL Co-Scoring Champion (1955)
MJHL Goal Scoring Leader (1955)
MJHL First Team Allstar (1955)
Northern Ontario Hockey Association Rookie of the Year (1957)
WHL Rookie of the Year Prairie Division (1958)
AHL First All-Star Team (1963, 1964, & 1965)
Calder Cup (AHL) Championship (1963)
AHL Most Valuable Player (1965 & 1974)
AHL Scoring Champion (1965)
CPHL First All-Star Team (1966 & 1967)
CPHL Scoring Champion (1966 & 1967)
CPHL Most Valuable Player (1966 & 1967)
AHL Second All-Star Team (1974)
SHL Second All-Star Team (1976)
SHL Most Valuable Player (1976)
"Honoured Member" of the Manitoba Hockey Hall of Fame

Career statistics

Regular season and playoffs

References

External links

1935 births
Living people
Buffalo Bisons (AHL) players
Canadian ice hockey centres
Chicago Blackhawks players
Cleveland Barons (1937–1973) players
Detroit Red Wings players
Hampton Gulls (SHL) players
Ice hockey people from Winnipeg
New York Rangers players
Philadelphia Flyers players
Pittsburgh Hornets players
Pittsburgh Penguins players
Richmond Robins players
Rochester Americans players
St. Catharines Teepees players
Seattle Totems (WHL) players
Springfield Indians players
Tidewater Wings players
Virginia Wings players
Warroad Lakers players
Winnipeg Warriors (minor pro) players